The Koshi Provincial Assembly also known as the Koshi Pradesh Sabha, (Nepali: कोशी प्रदेश सभा) is the unicameral legislature of Koshi Province, one of the seven provinces in Nepal. The assembly is seated at the provincial capital at Biratnagar in Morang District at the District Coordination Committee Office. The assembly has 93 members of whom 56 are elected through first-past-the-post voting and 37 are elected through proportional representation. The term of the assembly is 5 years unless dissolved earlier.

The present First Provincial Assembly was constituted in 2017, after the 2017 provincial elections. The next election will take place when the five-year term ends by November 2022. Currently, Nepali Congress is the largest party of governing alliance.

History 
The Provincial Assembly of Province No. 1 is formed under Article 175 of the Constitution of Nepal 2015 which guarantees a provincial legislative for each province in the country. The first provincial elections were conducted for all seven provinces in Nepal and the elections in Province No. 1 was conducted for 93 seats to the assembly. The election resulted in a victory for the CPN (Unified Marxist–Leninist) and CPN (Maoist Centre) alliance which later went on to form a coalition government under Sher Dhan Rai from CPN (UML). The first meeting of the provincial assembly was held on 5 February 2018. Pradeep Kumar Bhandari from CPN (UML) was elected as the first speaker of the provincial assembly, and Saraswoti Pokharel from Maoist Centre as the first deputy speaker of the provincial assembly.

List of assemblies

Committees 
Article 195 of the Constitution of Nepal provides provincial assemblies the power to form special committees in order to manage working procedures.

Current composition

See also 
 Province No. 1
 Provincial assemblies of Nepal

References

Koshi Province
Province legislatures of Nepal
Government of Koshi Province
Unicameral legislatures